American Spirit may refer to:
American Spirit (album), a Mannheim Steamroller album
American Spirit (schooner), a schooner
American Spirit (ship), a small cruise ship
Natural American Spirit, a tobacco brand
The American Spirit, a 2017 book written by David McCullough

See also
American Spirit Foundation
American Spirit Honor Medal